Pont d'Anyós  is a bridge located in La Massana Parish, Andorra. It is a heritage property registered in the Cultural Heritage of Andorra. It was built in 1950–52.

References

La Massana
Bridges in Andorra
Cultural Heritage of Andorra
Bridges completed in 1952